The fourth season of The Boulet Brothers' Dragula aired from October 19, 2021, and concluded on December 21, 2021, broadcast on Shudder across all territories, featuring 11 contestants competing for the title of World's Next Drag Supermonster and a cash prize of $100,000. Contestants in the season included RuPaul's Drag Race alumni Jade Jolie, season three contestant Saint, who earned a spot in the competition after winning The Boulet Brothers' Dragula: Resurrection special, and season two contestant Dahli, also a participant in the Resurrection special, the latter entered the competition from the second episode.

The winner of the fourth season of The Boulet Brothers' Dragula was Dahli, with HoSo Terra Toma, Saint and Sigourney Beaver as the runners-up.

Contestants

Contestant progress
Legend:

Exterminations

 The contestant was exterminated after their first participation in the challenge.
 The contestant was exterminated after their second participation in the challenge.
 The contestant was exterminated after their third participation in the challenge.
 The contestant was exterminated after their participation in the final challenge of the season.

Guest judges

Episode summary

References

2021 American television seasons
2021 in LGBT history
The Boulet Brothers' Dragula